Marc Parmentier (born 24 March 1956) is a Belgian scientist, and professor at the Institute of Multi-disciplinary Research in Human and Molecular Biology (IRIBHM) of the Université Libre de Bruxelles (ULB), where he completed his PhD in 1990. His research interest is on G protein-coupled receptors (GPCR), and of transgenic models of human pathologies. In 1999, he was awarded the Francqui Prize on Biological and Medical Sciences.

Awards
 1985 - Marc Herlant prize
 1991 - Galien Prize of Pharmacology
 1993 - Belgian Endocrine Society Lecture
 1994 - Harrington De Vishere prize of the European Thyroid Association
 1997 - Merck Sharpe and Dohme prize
 1998 - Liliane Bettencourt Prize
 1999 - Francqui Prize

Publications
 Parmentier M, Libert F, Maenhaut C, Lefort A, Gérard C, Perret J, Van Sande J, Dumont JE and Vassart G., Molecular cloning of the thyrotropin receptor, Science 246 (1989), 1620–1622.
 Parmentier M, Libert F, Schurmans, S., Shiffmann S, Lefort A, Eggerickx D, Ledent C, Mollereau C, Gérard C, Perret J, Grootegoed JA, and Vassart G., Expression of members of the putative olfactory receptor gene family in mammalian germ cells, Nature 355 (1992), 453–455.
 Samson M, Libert F, Doranz BJ, Rucker J, Liesnard C, Farber CM, Saragosti S, Lapouméroulie C, Cogniaux J, Forceille C, Muyldermans G, Verhofstede C, Guy Burtonboy G, Georges M, Imai T, Rana S, Yi Y, Smyth RJ, Collman RG, Doms RW, Vassart G and Parmentier M. Resistance to HIV-1 infection of Caucasian individuals bearing mutant alleles of the CCR5 chemokine receptor gene, Nature 382 (1996) 722–725.
 Ledent C, Valverde O, Cossu G, Petitet F, Aubert JF, Beslot F, Böhme GA, Imperato A, Pedrazzini T, Roques BP, Vassart G, Fratta W, Parmentier M. Unresponsiveness to cannabinoids and reduced addictive effects of opiates in CB1 receptor knock out mice. Science 285 (1999) 401–404.

Sources
 Marc Parmentier's profile at ULB (in French)
 Marc Parmentier (PDF)

1956 births
Belgian medical researchers
Université libre de Bruxelles alumni
Living people
Academic staff of the Université libre de Bruxelles